The Jugălia is a right tributary of the river Oltișor in Romania. It flows into the Oltișor near Piatra.

References

Rivers of Romania
Rivers of Olt County